King Cross Leopolis is a shopping mall located in Lviv, Ukraine that opened on March 26, 2010.

Description 
The first phase of the mall opened in 2008. It consisted solely of the Praktiker store, which occupied . In 2016, the store closed and in 2016 an EpiCentre K store opened in its place.

The second phase, opened in 2010, consists of the shopping mall itself.

A third phase of the mall is planned to be constructed in the future. It will include an additional  of lease area; this will include 130 commercial stores. Additionally, the parking area will be increased by 600 parking spaces.

References

External links
Official website

See also 
 Forum Lviv — another shopping mall in Lviv.

Shopping malls established in 2010
Shopping malls in Lviv